Now Is the Time is the eleventh studio album by South African singer Brenda Fassie. Released on August 4, 1996, by CCP Records, this is her eleventh album for the label. Now Is The Time features two duets with Congolese superstar Papa Wemba.

The album primarily incorporates Kwaito, gospel and Afropop music elements with lyrical themes of music industry experience and Fassie's faith in God.

Background 
During the 1990s, Fassie's life went into a downward spiral after her divorce from Nhlanhla Mbambo, and for years she checked in and out of drug rehabilitation clinics, and missed gigs. Following year 1996, opting to re-establish her music career, Fassie made her comeback producing her own the album and planning the project.

She collaborated with her long time producer Sello Chicco Twala. The album represents a departure from the Afropop music of Fassie's previous albums; Fassie's genre shift came after Kwaito was becoming a popular genre in South Africa.

Now is the time was released in 1996 by CCP Music in its physical form. EMI Digital re-released the album in its digital form in 2015 on the music streaming services like Spotify and the iTunes Store.

Track listing 

Notes

 "Tonight Is the Night" contains a sample of "Tonight Is the Night",written by Willie Clarke  performed by Betty Wright.

Personnel
Brenda Fassie – Vocals, producer
Papa Wemba – main vocals (track 4)

Release history

References

Brenda Fassie albums
1996 albums